(No Pussyfooting) is the debut studio album by the British duo Fripp & Eno, released in 1973. (No Pussyfooting) was the first of three major collaborations between the musicians, growing out of Brian Eno's early tape delay looping experiments and Robert Fripp's "Frippertronics" electric guitar technique.

(No Pussyfooting) was recorded in three days over the course of a year. Its release was close to that of Eno's own debut solo album Here Come the Warm Jets (1974), and it constitutes one of his early experiments in ambient music.

Production
Brian Eno invited Robert Fripp to his London home studio in September 1972. Eno was then experimenting with a tape-delay feedback system that he first devised while studying at the Winchester School of Art and further described in a score called "Delay and Decay”, published in late 1966. The system had been used earlier by Terry Riley and an anonymous ORTF engineer in Paris in 1963 and named the "Time-Lag Accumulator": two reel-to-reel tape recorders are set up side by side and sounds recorded on the first deck would be played back by the second deck, and then routed back into the first deck to create a long looping tape delay. Fripp played guitar over Eno's loops, while Eno selectively looped or recorded Fripp's guitar without looping it. The result is a dense, multi-layered piece of early ambient music. This technique later came to be known as "Frippertronics"

(No Pussyfooting)'''s first track, which fills one side, is a 21-minute piece titled "The Heavenly Music Corporation". Fripp originally wanted the track titled "The Transcendental Music Corporation", which Eno didn't allow as he feared it would make people "think they were serious". It was recorded in two takes, first creating the background looping track, then adding an extended non-looped guitar solo over the backing track. This track features Fripp's electric guitar as the sole sound source.

The second track "Swastika Girls", which fills the other side, was recorded almost a year after "The Heavenly Music Corporation" in August 1973 at Command Studios at 201 Piccadilly in London, where Fripp's King Crimson had recorded their acclaimed Larks' Tongues in Aspic album earlier that year. The track employed the same technique as "The Heavenly Music Corporation" except Fripp played to a background electronic loop created by Eno on VCS3. Fripp and Eno took the tapes of "Swastika Girls" to British record producer George Martin's AIR Studios at Oxford Circus to continue mixing and assembling the track there. The track's title refers to an image of nude women performing a Nazi salute that was ripped from a discarded pornographic film magazine found by Eno at AIR Studios. Eno stuck the image on the recording console while recording the track with Fripp and it became the title of the track.

Release and reception

Released in November 1973, (No Pussyfooting) failed to chart in either the US or UK. Island Records  actively opposed it. The album was released in the same year that Eno recorded his more rock-based solo album Here Come the Warm Jets. Eno was attempting to launch a solo career, having left Roxy Music, and his management bemoaned the confusion caused by two albums with such different styles. Robert Fripp's bandmates in King Crimson also disliked the album. The mainstream rock press paid the album little attention compared to Fripp's work with King Crimson and Eno's solo album.

In the UK, the album was released at a large discount compared to normal prices and was regarded as something of a novelty. In 1975, Robert Christgau, critic for The Village Voice, gave the album a B+ rating, calling it "the most enjoyable pop electronics since Terry Riley's A Rainbow in Curved Air" and that it was "...more visionary and more romantic than James Taylor could dream of being."

The album was rereleased on vinyl in 1982, and on CD in 1987 by E.G. Records. Modern reception has been mostly positive. Ted Mills of AllMusic gave the album four and a half stars out of five, praising "Heavenly Music Corporation" and noting "the beauty" of their tape deck setup, yet giving a negative view of "Swastika Girls", suggesting the loop system was abused with "too many disconnected sounds sharing the space, some discordant, some melodic... the resulting work lacks form and structure". Eric Tamm, the author of the Eno biography Brian Eno: His Music and the Vertical Color of Sound (1995) reacted similarly to Mills, stating that "The Heavenly Music Corporation" "anticipated Eno's own ambient style." About "Swastika Girls" Tamm said, "if it is less successful than the earlier piece, it is because of the much greater overall saturation of the acoustical space. There seems to be a perceptual rule that possibilities for appreciation of timbral subtleties decrease in proportion to the rate of actual notes being played. 'Swastika Girls' shows that Eno and Fripp had not yet understood the full weight of this principle".

More recent reviews of Fripp & Eno's album The Equatorial Stars (2004) cite (No Pussyfooting) in a positive light. Peter Marsh for the BBC's experimental music review referred to the album as "now one of those albums that's spoken about in hushed, reverential tones as a proto-ambient classic". Dominique Leone of the music webzine Pitchfork noted that "to [Fripp's] and Eno's credit, it didn't really sound like anything that had come before it".

"I was told later," recalled Fripp, "that, as a consequence of the album, Eno's management decided he was ready to go solo. They thought he had a far more glittering commercial career available to him than working with the progressive rock, left-field guitarist Robert Fripp, which now seems absurd. However, here are the ironies: David Bowie was a fan, I believe, of (No Pussyfooting); and I was told that Iggy Pop, who David was working with at the time, could sing all the main guitar themes."

A double CD 24 bit remastered edition, by Simon Heyworth and Robert Fripp was released in 2008, the bonus disc featuring reversed versions of both tracks and a half-speed version of "The Heavenly Music Corporation".

Track listing

Remastered edition (2008)
The double CD remastered edition adds variations to the track list:

24 bit remaster by Simon Heyworth and Robert Fripp. This edition also divides "Heavenly" into five CD tracks and "Swastika Girls" into two. The inclusion of the reversed versions is based on the incident where Fripp and Eno sent John Peel a copy of the album on open reel tape instead of standard vinyl, and had it "tails out" on what was meant to be the take-up reel, meaning that the tape had to be rewound to the beginning before playing it. On the December 18, 1973 broadcast of his Radio 1 show Top Gear, Peel played the entire album - backwards, showing that the "tails out" notice was disregarded. Eno had been listening to Peel's show and phoned the BBC demanding to speak with him, but the receptionist took exception to his tone and hung up on him, and the playback continued unabated. After the second track, Peel said on the air, "I'd like to see what they made of that on Come Dancing''...Opinion in here is divided...I think it's great, I really do, magnificent, in fact, in the Tangerine [Dream] tradition, I suppose, in a sense. Very very good, and well worth having the LP, incidentally."

Legacy 
The album artwork influenced the music video set for The 1975's 2018 single, "Give Yourself a Try", and The Strokes' 2003 single "The End Has No End". Electronic music composer Kim Cascone uses the moniker Heavenly Music Corporation in tribute to Fripp & Eno.

Personnel
Brian Eno – synthesizer, keyboards, treatments, VCS 3 synthesizer
Robert Fripp – electric and acoustic guitars

Technical personnel
Tony Arnold – remastering
Arun Chakraverty – engineer, mastering
Willie Christie – design, photography, cover design, cover art
Brian Eno – producer
Robert Fripp – producer, remastering
Ray Hendriksen – engineer

Release history

Notes

References

External links
 

1973 albums
Brian Eno albums
Robert Fripp albums
Albums produced by Robert Fripp
Island Records albums
Collaborative albums
Albums produced by Brian Eno